Lingappa Basavaraju (5 August 1919 – 29 January 2012), commonly known as L. Basavaraju or LB, was an Indian scholar, writer, critic and researcher in Kannada. He was the author of over 56 works and his contribution to Kannada literature spread over 40 years.

Early life and education
Basavaraju was born in Idagur a small village in Chikkaballapur district. After receiving early education in Idagur, Siddaganga and Bangalore, he moved to Mysore for higher education. He obtained B.A (Hons) (1946) and M.A. (1951) degrees in Kannada from the University of Mysore. He was awarded a D.Litt. degree from the same university for his work ‘Shivadasa Geetanjali’.  After an early stint of teaching at Davanagere and The Yuvaraja's college, Mysore, Basavaraju joined the Institute of Kannada Studies in the University of Mysore in 1967 and retired in 1979.

Literary works
Basavaraju brought many innovative ideas to the field of textual criticism. His sole aim was to bring the literary classics and scholarly treatises of Kannada within the reach of the common man un-acquainted with old Kannada. He prepared simplified prose versions of many important texts. He also experimented with splitting the poems in ancient texts in to their morphological components and then arranging them in a more communicable order, with appropriate punctuation marks. Before undertaking these innovative steps he worked diligently with old paper ones and palm leaf manuscripts   and strove to get to the original version. He was quite secular in his choice of works and chose Jaina classics such as Adipurana, Buddhist classics such as Ashvaghosha's ‘Buddhacharita’ and also works such as Toraveya Ramayana and Shabdamanidarpana.

The works edited by L.Basavaraju include:-
Basaveshvara Vachanasangraha (1952)
Allamana Vachanachandrike (1960)
Shivadasa Geethanjali (1963)
Basava Vachanamrutha (In two parts) (1964, 1970 and 1989)
Akkana Vachanagalu (1966)
Allamana Vachanagalu (1969)
Basavannanavara Vachanagalu (1996)
Basavannanavara Shatsthalada Vachanagalu (1990)  
Devara Dasimayyana Vachanagalu                       
Sarvajnana Vachanagalu (‘Paramartha’) (1972)
Bedagina Vachanagalu (1998)
Shivaganaprasadi Mahadevayyana Prabhudevara Shunyasampadane (1969)   
Kalyanada Mayidevana Shivanubhava Sutra (1998)
Pampana ‘Adipurana’ (1976)
Pampana ‘Sarala Pampabharata’ (1999)
Pampana ‘Samasta Bharatha Kathamrutha’ (2000)
Pampana ‘Sarala Adipurana’ (2002)
Pampana Adipurana Kathamrutha (2003)
Rannana ‘Sarala Gadayuddha’ (2005)
‘Chikkadevaraya Saptapadi’ by Tirumalarya (1971)
‘Torave Ramayana Sangraha’ (1951)
‘Sarala Siddaramacharite’ (2000)
Raghavankana ‘Sarala Harishchandra Kavya’ (2001)
‘Kannada Chandassamputa’ (1974)
(This is an edited work, containing all the four ancient Kannada works on prosody. They are ‘Chandombudhi’ by Nagavarma, ‘Kavijihvabandhana’ by Eshvara Kavi, ‘Chandassara’ by Gunachandra and ‘Chandornava’ by Veerabhadra.)    
"Keshirajana Shabdamanidarpana’ (1986)

L.Basavaraju has translated a few works from Sanskrit. They are
‘Buddhacharite’ by Ashvaghosha (2000) 
‘Soundarananda’ by Ashvaghosha (2000)
Bhasana ‘Bharata Rupaka’ (1958)
‘Natakamrutha Bindugalu’ (1958) 
‘Ramayana Nataka Triveni’ (1958)
(Translation of three plays by Bhasa including ‘Pratima Nataka’)
‘Nijagunashivayogiya Tatvadarshana’ (1961)
(Prose rendering of six philosophical treatises of Nijaguna Shivayogi)

Basavaraju took to creative writing at the age of seventy five and published three collections of poems namely ‘Thanantara’, (1994) (TANAnthara) ‘Jalari’ (jAlAri) (1995) and ‘Chayibaba’ (cAyibAbA) (2005).

Works on the life of LB
Critic C. P. Siddhashrama has written a book, L. Basavaraju Avara Jeevana Mattu Sahitya Vimarshe (2005).

Writer Kupnalli M. Byrappa has written the book Janamukhi: Prof. L. Basavaraju Avara Kruthishodha.

Death
Basavaraju died on the night of 29 January 2012 at Mysore.

Awards 

He received several awards, including:

 1977 - Karnataka Sahitya Academy.
 1994 - Kannada Rajyothsava Award
 1994 - Karnataka Sahitya Akademi Award for Poetry for Thaanaanthara
 2000 - Sahitya Akademi Prize for Translation in Kannada.
 2005 - Bhasha Samman conferred by Central Sahitya Akademi.
 2005 – Basava Puraskara
 2008 - Nadoja Award by Kannada University

The other awards conferred on him are Chidhananda Award, Prof. Sam.Shi. Bhusanur Mutt Foundation Award, Pampa Prashasthi and the Chavundaraya Award. The areas of his specialization included textual criticism, prosody, literary research and translation. He tried his hand in poetry as well and published three collections.

References

Literature of Karnataka
People from Kolar
1919 births
2012 deaths
Recipients of the Sahitya Akademi Prize for Translation